Japanese football in 1928.

Emperor's Cup

Births
June 25 - Seki Matsunaga
September 30 - Takeshi Inoue

External links

 
Seasons in Japanese football